X/Y is a 2014 American drama film written and directed by Ryan Piers Williams and starring America Ferrera, Ryan Piers Williams, Melonie Diaz, Jon Paul Phillips, Amber Tamblyn, David Harbour, and Common. The film premiered at the Tribeca Film Festival on April 19, 2014.

Cast
 America Ferrera as Silvia
 Ryan Piers Williams as Mark
 Melonie Diaz as Jen
 Jon Paul Phillips as Jake
 Amber Tamblyn as Stacey
 David Harbour as Todd
 Common as Jason
 Danny Deferrari

References

External links
 
 

2014 drama films
American drama films
Films shot in New York City
2010s English-language films
2010s American films